Werner Herman Otto Krogmann (February 5, 1901 – November 19, 1954) was a German Sailor. He won the Silver medal in Monotype class (O-Jolle) in the 1936 Summer Olympics in Berlin.

References

1901 births
1954 deaths
German male sailors (sport)
Sailors at the 1936 Summer Olympics – O-Jolle
Sailors at the 1952 Summer Olympics – Finn
Olympic sailors of Germany
Olympic silver medalists for Germany
Olympic medalists in sailing
Medalists at the 1936 Summer Olympics
Place of birth missing